NERA Economic Consulting, Inc., or National Economic Research Associates, is an economic consulting firm founded in 1961. It was the first consulting firm dedicated to methodically applying microeconomic theory to litigation and regulatory matters. The firm applies econometric and statistical analysis to provide strategy, studies, reports, expert testimony, and policy recommendations for government authorities, law firms, and corporations.

The company is based in the United States and has offices in North America, Europe, Asia, and Australia. NERA employs more than 500 professionals, most of whom have advanced degrees in economics, finance, law or business.

NERA is a part of the Oliver Wyman Group, a subsidiary of the Marsh and McLennan Companies, a global professional services firm.

Recognition
NERA ranked second in Vault's 2018 survey of the top firms in economic consulting. The New York Times called it "one of the country’s oldest and best-known economic consultancies." Laurence Tribe, professor of constitutional law at Harvard Law School, said that NERA is "one of the world’s foremost economic consultancies."

In June 2017, President Donald Trump cited statistics from a study by NERA in a speech announcing his plan to pull the United States out of the Paris Agreement. The study, which was prepared to measure the economic impact of hypothetical regulatory actions necessary to meet the goals of the Paris Agreement, was criticized for overestimating the costs of reducing greenhouse gas emissions. In a response, NERA said that the Trump Administration selectively used results of the study that mischaracterized its purpose and analysis.

See also
Analysis Group
Bates White
Berkeley Research Group
Brattle Group
Charles River Associates
Compass Lexecon
Cornerstone Research
Frontier Economics
Fideres

References

External links
Official Website

Macroeconomics consulting firms
Consulting firms established in 1961
Consulting firms of the United States
International consulting firms